The Alpine Lakes Wilderness contains a number of mountain peaks and ranges:

Snoqualmie peaks

 Kaleetan Peak — 
 Chair Peak — 
 Denny Mountain — 
 Guye Peak — 
 Hibox Mountain — 
 Snoqualmie Mountain — 
 Lundin Peak — ft
 Red Mountain — ft
 Kendall Peak — 
 Mount Thomson — 
 Bryant Peak — 
 The Tooth— 
 Mount Defiance — 
 Rampart Ridge — 
 Mount Roosevelt— 
 Three Queens— 
 Dungeon Peak — 
 Alaska Mountain — 
 Wright Mountain —

Dutch Miller Gap peaks

 Chikamin Peak — 
 Dip Top Peak — 
 Four Brothers — 
 Lemah Mountain — 
 Chimney Rock — 
 Huckleberry Mountain — 
 Overcoat Peak — 
 Summit Chief Mountain — 
 Mount Hinman — 
 Mount Daniel — 
 Little Big Chief Mountain — 
 Bears Breast Mountain — 
 Big Snow Mountain — 
 Cathedral Rock — 
 La Bohn Peak — 
 Burnt Boot Peak — 
 Terrace Mountain —  
 Iron Cap Mountain —  
 Malachite Peak—

Wenatchee Mountains

 Cashmere Mountain — 
 Eightmile Mountain — 
 Granite Mountain — 
 Ingalls Peak —  
 The Cradle — 
 Fortune Peak  — 
 Navaho Peak — 
 Harding Mountain  — 
 Bills Peak — 
 Mac Peak — 
 Teanaway Peak — 
 Surprise Mountain  — 
 Spark Plug Mountain — 
 Three Brothers  — 
 Thunder Mountain — 
 Trico Mountain —

Chiwaukum Mountains

 Big Chiwaukum — 
 Snowgrass Mountain — 
 Big Lou — 
 Big Jim Mountain — 
 Ladies Peak — 
 Grindstone Mountain — 
 Cape Horn — 
 Bulls Tooth — 
 Jim Hill Mountain — 
 Arrowhead Mountain —

Stuart Range

 Mount Stuart — 
 Argonaut Peak — 
 Colchuck Peak — 
 Dragontail Peak — 
 Edward Peak — 
 Enchantment Peak — 
 Jabberwocky Tower — 
 Little Annapurna — 
 McClellan Peak — 
 Prusik Peak — 
 Cannon Mountain — 
 The Temple —  
 Witches Tower —  
 Wedge Mountain —   
 The Enchantments

References

See also

List of lakes in the Alpine Lakes Wilderness
Ecology of the North Cascades
Geography of the North Cascades
List of highest mountain peaks in Washington

.
North Cascades of Washington (state)
Lists of landforms of Washington (state)
Lists of mountains of the United States
Wenatchee National Forest
Mount Baker-Snoqualmie National Forest